Alexandra "Alice" Teodorescu (born 2 May 1984) is a Swedish legal professional with the Företagarna organisation of Swedish entrepreneurs and a commentator on social and political issues.

Early life
Teodorescu was born in Bucharest, Romania, but came to Sweden as a child in 1989 and was raised in Lund. She attended the Sture Academy, a training programme for young people run by liberal think tank Timbro.

Career
After completing her legal training, she worked as an intern in the Brussels office of Svenskt Näringsliv and then became a communication strategist for the newspaper. She has also been an editorial writer for newspapers including Barometern in Oskarshamn and Gotlands Allehanda. In 2009, she founded a women's network called En plats i himlen för kvinnor som hjälper varandra (a place in heaven for women who help each other).

Teodorescu "has made herself known as a provocative and fearless liberal debater". She has criticised gender quotas on corporate boards and advocated a policy of equality based on individualism rather than collectivism. She has also written on integration and education. In February 2014 she attracted much attention by calling in a debate on the Sveriges Radio channel 1 programme P1 Debatt for a clear definition of the term "racism" and questioning whether racism in Sweden was structural. She also argued that it was time for a more nuanced, less dogmatic and polarising debate on the issue. During the Almedalen week in June and July 2014  Ali Esbati refused to shake hands with Teodorescu after a live broadcast debate between the two, this after a discussion about racism in Sweden. After the debate both Teodorescu and Esbati received criticism for not considering each other's opinions. In a subsequent opinion piece in Svenska Dagbladet, Teodorescu complained about what she saw as the lenient treatment of the Green Party by the press.

References

External links

Alice Teodorescu at Svenska Dagbladet

1984 births
Living people
People from Lund
Swedish jurists
21st-century Swedish businesswomen
21st-century Swedish businesspeople
Swedish people of Romanian descent
Sommar (radio program) hosts